The following is a list of low-cost carriers organised by home country. A low-cost carrier or low-cost airline (also known as a no-frills, discount or budget carrier or airline) is an airline that offers generally low fares in exchange for eliminating many traditional passenger services.

Africa 

Air Arabia Egypt
Air Cairo
FlyEgypt

Jambojet
Fly540

Air Arabia Maroc

Green Africa Airways

FlySafair

Fastjet Zimbabwe

Americas 

Flybondi
JetSmart Argentina

Gol Transportes Aéreos
Azul Brazilian Airlines

Flair Airlines
Canada Jetlines
Lynx Air
Sunwing Airlines
Swoop

Sky Airline
JetSmart

Wingo
Ultra Air

Volaris Costa Rica

Air Caraïbes

AraJet
RED Air

Volaris El Salvador

EasySky

Calafia Airlines
VivaAerobús
Volaris

JetSmart Perú
Sky Airline Peru

InterCaribbean Airways

Allegiant Air
Avelo Airlines
Frontier Airlines
JetBlue
Northern Pacific Airways
Southwest Airlines
Spirit Airlines
Sun Country Airlines

Venezolana

Asia 

Fly Arna
FlyOne Armenia

Buta Airways

9 Air
Beijing Capital Airlines
Chengdu Airlines
Colorful Guizhou Airlines
China United Airlines
Jiangxi Air
Lucky Air
Ruili Airlines
Spring Airlines
Urumqi Air
West Air

Greater Bay Airlines
HK Express

AirAsia India
Air India Express
Akasa Air
Go First
IndiGo
SpiceJet

Citilink
Indonesia AirAsia
Lion Air
Super Air Jet
TransNusa
Wings Air

Jetstar Japan
Peach Aviation
Skymark Airlines
Spring Airlines Japan
Zipair Tokyo

FlyArystan

Air Manas

Jazeera Airways

AirAsia
AirAsia X
Firefly
MYAirline

Salam Air

Airblue
Fly Jinnah

Cebu Pacific
Philippines AirAsia

Flynas
Flyadeal

Jetstar Asia Airways
Scoot

Air Busan
Air Premia
Air Seoul
Eastar Jet
Fly Gangwon
Jeju Air
Jin Air
T'way Air
Aero_K

Tigerair Taiwan

Nok Air
Thai AirAsia
Thai AirAsia X
Thai Lion Air
Thai Vietjet Air

Air Arabia
flydubai
Wizz Air Abu Dhabi

Pacific Airlines
VietJet Air

Europe

Albawings

EasyJet Europe
Eurowings Europe

Smartwings

French Bee
Transavia France

Eurowings

Wizz Air

Play

Ryanair

Aeroitalia

Malta Air
Lauda Europe
Wizz Air Malta

FlyOne
HiSky

Transavia

Norse Atlantic Airways
Norwegian Air Norway
Norwegian Air Shuttle

Buzz

Citrus
Pobeda
Smartavia

 Air Europa Express
 Iberia Express
 Level
 Volotea
 Vueling

Norwegian Air Sweden

EasyJet Switzerland

Pegasus Airlines

SkyUp

EasyJet
Flypop
Jet2.com
Norse Atlantic UK
Ryanair UK
Wizz Air UK

Oceania 

Jetstar Airways
Bonza

Largest low-cost carriers 

This is a list of largest low-cost carriers in the world, ranked by number of transported passengers, shown below in millions.

Notes
 Includes EasyJet Switzerland.
 Includes AirAsia India, Airasia X, Indonesia Airasia, Philippines AirAsia, Thai AirAsia and Thai AirAsia X.
 Includes Batik Air, Wings Air, Batik Air Malaysia, Thai Lion Air, Super Air Jet, Lion BizJet (charter airline division) and Lion Parcel (cargo airline division).
 Includes Wizz Air Abu Dhabi and Wizz Air UK.
 Includes Jetstar Asia Airways, Jetstar Japan and Jetstar Pacific.
 Includes Cebgo.
 Includes Transavia France.
 Includes Thai Vietjet Air.
 Includes Air Arabia Maroc, Air Arabia Egypt and Air Arabia Jordan.
 Includes Fastjet Tanzania and Fastjet Zimbabwe.

Defunct low-cost carriers

Africa

Antinea Airlines
Ecoair International

Atlas Blue
Jet4you

Fastjet Mozambique

1time
Mango
Velvet Sky
Kulula
Skywise Airlines
SA Express

Fastjet Tanzania

Zimbabwe flyafrica.com

America

LASA Líneas Aéreas
Norwegian Air Argentina
Sol Líneas Aéreas

REDjet

BRA Transportes Aéreos
OceanAir
WebJet Linhas Aéreas

Latin American Wings

Air Canada Tango
Canada 3000
CanJet
Canada Jetlines
Greyhound Air
Harmony Airways
Jetsgo
Vistajet
Wardair
WestJet (transitioned to full-service carrier)
Zip
Zoom Airlines

AIRES
Intercontinental de Aviación
Viva Air Colombia

Aeropostal Alas de Centroamerica

Icaro Air

Aero California
Aladia
Aviacsa
Avolar
Click Mexicana (until 2008; Click was rebranded MexicanaClick and was no longer a low-cost airline)
Interjet
Líneas Aéreas Azteca
SARO
TAESA Lineas Aéreas

Viva Air Perú

Air Florida
AirTran Airways (acquired by Southwest Airlines)
America West Airlines (merged into US Airways
ATA Airlines
Braniff (1991-1992)
Eastern Air Lines (2015)
Hooters Air
Independence Air
MetroJet
Midway Airlines
National Airlines
Pacific Southwest Airlines
People Express
Safe Air
Skybus Airlines
SkyValue
Song (operations folded into Delta Air Lines)
Southeast Airlines
Streamline Air
Ted (operations folded into United Airlines)
Tower Air
ValuJet Airlines
Vanguard Airlines
Virgin America (merged with Alaska Airlines)
Western Pacific Airlines

U Air

Asia

AZALJet

Bahrain Air

Flyvista

Oasis Hong Kong Airlines

Adam Air
Bali Air
Batavia Air
Indonesia AirAsia X

JetKonnect (merged with Jet Airways)
Jetlite (merged with Jet Airways)
Kingfisher Red
Paramount Airways
Simplifly Deccan

Up

AirAsia Japan
Air Next
Link Airs
Vanilla Air (merged with Peach Aviation)

Air Arabia Jordan

Viva Macau

Cosmic Air
Fly Yeti

Rayyan Air
Bhoja Air
Shaheen Air

Spirit of Manila Airlines
Zest Airways (merged into Philippines AirAsia)

Sama

Tigerair (merged with Scoot)
Valuair (acquired in 2005 by Jetstar Asia Airways; dissolved in 2014)

Air Pohang

Mihin Lanka (merged with SriLankan Airlines)

U-Land Airlines
V Air

NokScoot
One-Two-GO Airlines
Solar Air

Kang Pacific Airlines

'
Wataniya Airways

Europe

Albatros Airways
Belle Air

Laudamotion
Level Europe
Niki

Virgin Express (merged with SN Brussels Airlines to form Brussels Airlines)

Wizz Air Bulgaria

Eurocypria
Helios Airways

Blue Air Moravia

Sterling Airlines
Transavia.com Denmark

FaroeJet

Flying Finn

Air Turquoise
Flywest

Air Berlin (became a full-service airline in 2010 and collapsed in 2017)
DBA
Germanwings (merged with Eurowings)
HLX (merged with Hapagfly to Tuifly, city routes then sold to Air Berlin)
OLT Express Germany

 Ellinair
 Hellas Jet
 Macedonian Airlines

Iceland Express
Loftleiðir
WOW Air

Norwegian Air International

Air One
Air Service Plus
Alpieagles
Blu-express
Club Air
MyAir
Volare Airlines

V Bird

Color Air
Feel Air
Flyr
Norwegian Long Haul

Air Polonia
Centralwings
Direct Fly
GetJet
OLT Express Poland

Blue Air (suspended)
Carpatair (now operates as a regional airline)
Fly Romania

Avianova
Dobrolet
Sky Express

Centavia

SkyEurope

Spanair

Flyme
FlyNordic
Snowflake

Bees Airline
Wizz Air Ukraine

Air Scotland
bmibaby
Court Line
Debonair
Duo Airways
Flybe
flyglobespan
Go
Laker Airways
Monarch Airlines
Norwegian Air UK

Oceania

Air Australia
Compass Airlines
East-West Airlines
Impulse Airlines (acquired by Qantas and rebranded as Jetstar and QantasLink)
Tigerair Australia
Virgin Blue (transitioned into a full-service airline in 2011 and renamed Virgin Australia)

Freedom Air
Kiwi Airlines
Pacific Blue Airlines (now codeshares with Air New Zealand and is a full service brand — Virgin Australia)

See also 

 Flag carrier
 List of regional airlines
 Lists of airlines

References 

Low-cost
 
Airlines Low-Cost